The 1903 World Figure Skating Championship was 8th edition of World figure Skating Championship, an annual figure skating competition sanctioned by the International Skating Union in which figure skaters compete for the title of World Champion.

The competition took place from February 20 to 21 at the Yusupovsky Garden in Saint Petersburg, Russian Empire and was timed to 200-year Jubilee of Saint Petersburg.

Carried out of the competition for the second time won the pairs competition sporting a pairs: Christina von Szabo / G. Euler (1st place) and brother and sister Mizzi Bohatsch / Otto Bohatsch (2nd place) both of Austria. Third place is left for a couple of Berlinger / Stahlberg from Germany.

Results

Judges:
 Eduard von Löhr 
 G. Wendt 
 Tibor von Földváry 
 Georg Sanders 
 A. Iwaschenzow

References

Sources
 Result List provided by the ISU

World Figure Skating Championships
World Figure Skating Championships, 1903
1903 in the Russian Empire
International figure skating competitions hosted by Russia
Sports competitions in Saint Petersburg
February 1903 sports events
1900s in Saint Petersburg